Yekshaveh (also known as Yek Shabā) is a village in Behi-e Feyzolah Beygi Rural District, in the Central District of Bukan County, West Azerbaijan Province, Iran. At the 2006 census, its population was 546, in 107 families.

References 

Populated places in Bukan County